A mud volcano or mud dome is a landform created by the eruption of mud or slurries, water and gases. Several geological processes may cause the formation of mud volcanoes. Mud volcanoes are not true igneous volcanoes as they do not produce lava and are not necessarily driven by magmatic activity. Mud volcanoes may range in size from merely 1 or 2 meters high and 1 or 2 meters wide, to 700 meters high and 10 kilometers wide. Smaller mud exudations are sometimes referred to as mud-pots.

The mud produced by mud volcanoes is mostly formed as hot water, which has been heated deep below the Earth's surface, begins to mix and blend with subterranean mineral deposits, thus creating the mud slurry exudate. This material is then forced upwards through a geological fault or fissure due to local subterranean pressure imbalances. Mud volcanoes are associated with subduction zones and about 1100 have been identified on or near land. The temperature of any given active mud volcano generally remains fairly steady and is much lower than the typical temperatures found in igneous volcanoes. Mud volcano temperatures can range from near  to occasionally , some being used as popular "mud baths".

About 86% of the gas released from these structures is methane, with much less carbon dioxide and nitrogen emitted. Ejected materials are most often a slurry of fine solids suspended in water that may contain a mixture of salts, acids and various hydrocarbons.

Possible mud volcanoes have been identified on Mars.

Details

A mud volcano may be the result of a piercement structure created by a pressurized mud diapir that breaches the Earth's surface or ocean bottom. Their temperatures may be as low as the freezing point of the ejected materials, particularly when venting is associated with the creation of hydrocarbon clathrate hydrate deposits. Mud volcanoes are often associated with petroleum deposits and tectonic subduction zones and orogenic belts; hydrocarbon gases are often erupted. They are also often associated with lava volcanoes; in the case of such close proximity, mud volcanoes emit incombustible gases including helium, whereas lone mud volcanoes are more likely to emit methane.

Approximately 1,100 mud volcanoes have been identified on land and in shallow water. It has been estimated that well over 10,000 may exist on continental slopes and abyssal plains.

Features
 Gryphon: steep-sided cone shorter than 3 meters that extrudes mud
 Mud cone: high cone shorter than 10 meters that extrudes mud and rock fragments
 Scoria cone: cone formed by heating of mud deposits during fires
 Salse: water-dominated pools with gas seeps
 Spring: water-dominated outlets smaller than 0.5 metres
 Mud shield

Emissions

Most liquid and solid material is released during eruptions, but seeps occur during dormant periods.

The mud is rich in halite (rock salt).

First-order estimates of mud volcano emissions have been made (1 Tg = 1 million metric tonnes).
 2002: L. I. Dimitrov estimated that 10.2–12.6 Tg/yr of methane is released from onshore and shallow offshore mud volcanoes.
 2002: Etiope and Klusman estimated at least 1–2 and as much as 10–20 Tg/yr of methane may be emitted from onshore mud volcanoes.
 2003: Etiope, in an estimate based on 120 mud volcanoes: "The emission results to be conservatively between 5 and 9 Tg/yr, that is 3–6% of the natural methane sources officially considered in the atmospheric methane budget. The total geologic source, including MVs (this work), seepage from seafloor (Kvenvolden et al., 2001), microseepage in hydrocarbon-prone areas and geothermal sources (Etiope and Klusman, 2002), would amount to 35–45 Tg/yr."
 2003: analysis by Milkov et al. suggests that the global gas flux may be as high as 33 Tg/yr (15.9 Tg/yr during quiescent periods plus 17.1 Tg/yr during eruptions). Six teragrams per year of greenhouse gases are from onshore and shallow offshore mud volcanoes. Deep-water sources may emit 27 Tg/yr. Total may be 9% of fossil CH4 missing in the modern atmospheric CH4 budget, and 12% in the preindustrial budget.
 2003: Alexei Milkov estimated approximately 30.5 Tg/yr of gases (mainly methane and CO2) may escape from mud volcanoes to the atmosphere and the ocean.
 2003: Achim J. Kopf estimated 1.97×1011 to 1.23×1014 m³ of methane is released by all mud volcanoes per year, of which 4.66×107 to 3.28×1011 m³ is from surface volcanoes.  That converts to 141–88,000 Tg/yr from all mud volcanoes, of which 0.033–235 Tg is from surface volcanoes.

Locations

Europe

Dozens of mud volcanoes are located on the Taman Peninsula of Russia and the Kerch Peninsula of Crimea, Ukraine along with the south-western portion of Bulgaria near Rupite. In Italy, they are located in Emilia-Romagna (Salse di Nirano and Salse di Regnano), in the northern front of the Apennines as well as the southern part (Bolle della Malvizza), and in Sicily. On 24 August 2013, a mud volcano appeared in the center of the via Coccia di Morto roundabout in Fiumicino near Rome.

Mud volcanoes are located in the Berca Mud Volcanoes near Berca in Buzău County, Romania, close to the Carpathian Mountains. They were declared a natural monument in 1924.

Asia

Central Asia, The Caucasus, and The Caspian Sea
Many mud volcanoes exist on the shores of the Black Sea and Caspian Sea. Tectonic forces and large sedimentary deposits around the latter have created several fields of mud volcanoes, many of them emitting methane and other hydrocarbons.

Georgia 
There are mud volcanoes in Georgia, such as the one at Akhtala.

Turkmenistan 

Turkmenistan is home to numerous mud volcanoes, mainly in the Western part of the country including Cheleken Peninsula, which borders the Caspian Sea.

Iran and Pakistan (Makran Mountain Range) 
Iran and Pakistan possess mud volcanoes in the Makran range of mountains in the south of the two countries. A large mud volcano is located in Balochistan, Pakistan. It is known as Baba Chandrakup (literally Father Moonwell) on the way to Hinglaj and is a Hindu pilgrim site.

Azerbaijan

Azerbaijan and its Caspian coastline are home to nearly 400 mud volcanoes, more than half the total throughout the continents. Most mud volcanoes in Azerbaijan are active; some are protected by the Azerbaijan Ministry of Ecology and Natural Resources, and the admission of people, for security reasons, is prohibited.

In Azerbaijan, eruptions are driven from a deep mud reservoir which is connected to the surface even during dormant periods, when seeping water shows a deep origin. Seeps have temperatures that are generally above ambient ground temperature by  – .

The flames towered  into the air. There were no reports of injuries or damage to any oil platforms. The last previous volcanic eruption on the island was recorded in 1945 and the preceding one in 1920.

India
Extensive mud volcanism on the Andaman accretionary prism, located at the Andaman Islands in the Indian Ocean.

Indonesia

Mud volcanism is a common phenomenon in Indonesia with dozens of structures present onshore and offshore.

The Indonesian Lusi mud eruption is a hybrid mud volcano, driven by pressure from steam and gas from a nearby (igneous) volcanic system, and from natural gas. Geochemical, petrography and geophysical results reveal that it is a  hydrothermal system connected at depth with the neighboring Arjuno-Welirang volcanic complex.

Drilling or an earthquake in the Porong subdistrict of East Java province, Indonesia, may have resulted in the Sidoarjo mud flow on 29 May 2006. The mud covered about 440 hectares,  (2.73 mi2), and inundated four villages, homes, roads, rice fields, and factories, displacing about 24,000 people and killing 14. The gas exploration company involved was operated by PT Lapindo Brantas and the earthquake that may have triggered the mud volcano was the 6.3 magnitude Yogyakarta earthquake of 27 May 2006. According to geologists who have been monitoring Lusi and the surrounding area, the system is beginning to show signs of catastrophic collapse. A study by a group of Indonesian geoscientists led by Bambang Istadi predicted the area affected by the mudflow over a ten-year period. More recent studies carried out in 2011 predict that the mud will flow for another 20 years, or even longer. Now named Lusi – a contraction of Lumpur Sidoarjo, where lumpur is the Indonesian word for "mud" – the eruption represent an active hybrid system.

In the Suwoh depression in Lampung, dozens of mud cones and mud pots varying in temperature are found.

In Grobogan, Bledug Kuwu mud volcano erupts at regular intervals, about every 2 or 3 minutes.

Iran

There are many mud volcanoes in Iran: in particular, in the provinces of Golestan, Hormozgan, and Sistan and Baluchestan, where Pirgel is located.

Mariana Forearc 
There are 10 active mud volcanoes in the Izu–Bonin–Mariana Arc which can be found along a north to south trend, parallel to the Mariana trench. The material erupted at these mud volcanoes consists primarily of blue and green serpentinite mud which contains fresh and serpentinized peridotite material from the subduction channel. Fluid from the descending Pacific Plate is released by dehydration and alteration of rocks and sediment. This fluid interacts with mafic and ultramafic rocks in the descending Pacific Plate and overriding Philippine Plate, resulting in the formation of serpentinite mud. All of these mud volcanoes are associated with faults, indicating that the faults act as conduits for the serpentine mud to migrate from the subduction channel to the surface.

Pakistan

In Pakistan there are more than 130 active mud volcanoes or vents in Balochistan province; there are about 10 locations with clusters of mud volcanoes. In the west, in Gwadar District, the mud volcanoes are very small and mostly sit in the south of Jabal-e-Mehdi toward Sur Bandar. Many more are in the northeast of Ormara. The remainder are in Lasbela District and are scattered between south of Gorangatti on Koh Hinglaj to Koh Kuk in the North of Miani Hor in the Hangol Valley. The most famous is Chandragup. Most mud volcanoes in this region are in out-of-reach areas having very difficult terrain. Mount Mehdi Mud Volcano near Miani Hor is also famous for large mud glacier around its caldera. Dormant mud volcanoes stand like columns of mud in many other areas.

Philippines
In the Turtle Islands, in the province of Tawi-Tawi, the southwestern edge of the Philippines bordering Malaysia, presence of mud volcanoes are evident on three of the islands – Lihiman, Great Bakkungan and Boan Islands.  The northeastern part of Lihiman Island is distinguished for having a more violent kind of mud extrusions mixed with large pieces of rocks, creating a 20-m (66-ft) wide crater on that hilly part of the island. Such extrusions are reported to be accompanied by mild earthquakes and evidence of extruded materials can be found high in the surrounding trees. Submarine mud extrusions off the island have been observed by local residents.

Other Asian locations

 There are a number of mud volcanoes in Xinjiang.
 There are mud volcanoes at the Minbu Township, Magway Region, Myanmar (Burma).
 There are two active mud volcanoes in southern Taiwan and several inactive ones. The Wushan Mud Volcanoes are in the Yanchao District of Kaohsiung City. There are active mud volcanoes in Wandan township of Pingtung County.
 There are mud volcanoes on the island of Pulau Tiga, off the western coast of the Malaysian state of Sabah on Borneo.
 A drilling accident offshore of Brunei on Borneo in 1979 caused a mud volcano which took 20 relief wells and nearly 30 years to halt.
 Active mud volcanoes occur in Oesilo (Oecusse District, East Timor). A mud volcano in Bibiluto (Viqueque District) erupted between 1856 and 1879.

North America

Mud volcanoes of the North American continent include:
 A field of small (< high) fault-controlled, cold mud volcanoes is on California's Mendocino Coast, near Glenblair and Fort Bragg, California. The fine-grained clay is occasionally harvested by local potters.
 Shrub and Klawasi mud volcanoes in the Copper River basin by the Wrangell Mountains, Alaska. Emissions are mostly CO2 and nitrogen; the volcanoes are associated with magmatic processes.
 A field of small (<) mud volcanoes in the Salton Sea geothermal area near the town of Niland, California. Emissions are mostly CO2. One, known as the Niland Geyser, continues to move erratically.
 Kaglulik mud volcano,  under the surface of the Beaufort Sea, near the northern boundary of Alaska and Canada.  Petroleum deposits are believed to exist in the area.

Yellowstone's "Mud Volcano"

The name of Yellowstone National Park's "Mud Volcano" feature and the surrounding area is misleading; it consists of hot springs, mud pots and fumaroles, rather than a true mud volcano. Depending upon the precise definition of the term mud volcano, the Yellowstone formation could be considered a hydrothermal mud volcano cluster. The feature is much less active than in its first recorded description, although the area is quite dynamic. Yellowstone is an active geothermal area with a magma chamber near the surface, and active gases are chiefly steam, carbon dioxide, and hydrogen sulfide.

However, there are mud volcanoes and mud geysers elsewhere in Yellowstone. One, the "Vertically Gifted Cyclic Mud Pot" sometimes acts as a geyser, throwing mud up to 30 feet high.

The mud volcano feature in Yellowstone was previously a mound until a thermal explosion in the 1800s ripped it apart.

Caribbean

There are many mud volcanoes in Trinidad and Tobago in the Caribbean, near oil reserves in southern parts of the island of Trinidad. As of 15 August 2007, the mud volcano titled the Moruga Bouffle was said to being spitting up methane gas which shows that it is active. There are several other mud volcanoes in the tropical island which include:
 the Devil's Woodyard mud volcano near New Grant, Princes Town, Trinidad and Tobago
 the Moruga Bouffe mud volcano near Moruga
 the Digity mud volcano in Barrackpore
 the Piparo mud volcano
 the Chatham mud volcano underwater in the Columbus Channel; this mud volcano periodically produces a short-lived island.
 the Erin Bouffe mud volcano near Los Iros beach
 L'eau Michel mud volcano in Bunsee Trace, Penal

A number of large mud volcanoes have been identified on the Barbados accretionary complex, offshore Barbados.

South America

Venezuela

The eastern part of Venezuela contains several mud volcanoes (or mud domes), all of them having an origin related to oil deposits. Cattle from the savanna often gather around to lick the dried mud for its salt content.

Colombia
Volcan El Totumo, which marks the division between Bolívar and Atlantico in Colombia. This volcano is under legal dispute between the Bolívar and Atlántico Departamentos because of its tourist value.

Africa

Australasia

New Zealand
As well as the Runaruna Mud Volcano the size of the splatter cones associated with some of New Zealands many geothermal mud pools or mudpots might qualify, depending upon definition.

See also

 Asphalt volcano
 Black smoker
 Cold seep
 Hydrothermal vent
 Ice volcano
 Lahar – mud flow
 Methane hydrate
 Sand volcano
 Seamount
 Volcano – igneous volcano

References

External links

 Origin of mud volcanoes
  Cold water mud volcanoes created by artesian pressure in Minnesota's Nemadji River basin
 Bulletin Of Mud Volcanology Azerbaijan Academy Of Sciences (in English)
 Gaia's Breath—Methane and the Future of Natural Gas  – USGS, June 2003
 Azeri mud volcano flares – October 29, 2001, BBC report
 Redondo Beach mud volcano with methane hydrate deposits
 Hydrocarbons Associated with Fluid Venting Process in Monterey Bay, California
 Hydrothermal Activity and Carbon-Dioxide Discharge at Shrub and Upper Klawasi Mud Volcanoes, Wrangell Mountains, Alaska – U.S. Geological Survey Water-Resources Investigations Report 00-4207
 Mud Volcano Eruption at Baratang, Middle Andamans
 Article on mud volcanoes from Azerbaijan International
 Mud volcano floods Java, August 2006
 Mud volcano work suspended, 25 Feb 2007, Al Jazeera English
 Possible mud volcano on Mars (BBC News)
 Of Mud Pots and the End of the San Andreas Fault (Seismo Blog)
 Mud Volcanoes at West Nile Delta Video by GEOMAR I Helmholtz-Centre for Ocean Research Kiel
 
  showing the progress over time of the Niland Geyser

 
Petrology
Landforms
Sediments